Salisbury Road is a major road in Tsim Sha Tsui, Kowloon, Hong Kong.

Description
It runs parallel to Victoria Harbour, starting from its western end at the Star Ferry Pier, passing by Blackhead Point, to Tsim Sha Tsui East. It intersects with several major roads in the area, including Canton Road, Kowloon Park Drive, Nathan Road and Chatham Road South, and connects to the Hung Hom Bypass at its eastern end.

Landmarks
Several Hong Kong landmarks and points of interest are located along or near Salisbury Road, including the Star House, the 1881 Heritage complex (including the Former Marine Police Headquarters and the Old Kowloon Fire Station), YMCA of Hong Kong, the Peninsula Hotel, the Hong Kong Space Museum, the Hong Kong Cultural Centre, the Hong Kong Museum of Art, Victoria Dockside and the Tsim Sha Tsui Clock Tower. The Tsim Sha Tsui East Promenade, which runs alongside the road, has views of the Hong Kong skyline across Victoria Harbour.

History

Naming
The road was named after Robert Gascoyne-Cecil, 3rd Marquess of Salisbury, who served as the British Prime Minister in late 19th century.

The original transliteration of the road in Chinese, "梳利士巴利道", failed to account for the fact that the i in the word is silent. The Hong Kong Government corrected the transliteration in the 1970s by dropping the second character "利", and adopting the current name "梳士巴利道".

Railway
Salisbury Road was extended westwards to the tip of Tsim Sha Tsui in 1904. Train and ferry termini were erected at its end. The Kowloon–Canton Railway originally ran along Salisbury Road, and its terminus Kowloon station was located at the western end of road. The terminus was moved to Hung Hom station in 1974, and the station complex at Salisbury Road (except the Clock Tower) was demolished in 1977. However, the KCR returned to the area in 2004, when the East Rail extension was opened. The extension runs underneath Salisbury Road, with its station East Tsim Sha Tsui station located underneath the intersection of Salisbury Road and Chatham Road South.

Intersections

See also
 Victoria Dockside
 YMCA of Hong Kong
 New World Centre
 List of streets and roads in Hong Kong

References

Bibliography
 Hong Kong Guide 2006, Survey and Mapping Office, Government of Hong Kong.

External links

Google Maps of Salisbury Road

Roads in Kowloon
Tsim Sha Tsui
Yau Tsim Mong District